Middlebury Township is one of sixteen townships in Elkhart County, Indiana. As of the 2000 census, its population was 8,498.

Geography

Cities and towns
 Middlebury

Unincorporated towns
 Lake Grange
(This list is based on USGS data and may include former settlements.)

Adjacent townships
 York Township (north)
 Van Buren Township, LaGrange County (northeast)
 Newbury Township, LaGrange County (east)
 Eden Township, LaGrange County (southeast)
 Clinton Township (south)
 Elkhart Township (southwest)
 Jefferson Township (west)
 Washington Township (northwest)

Major highways

Cemeteries
The township contains five cemeteries: Eldridge, Forest Grove, Geising, Grace Lawn and Miller.

References
 United States Census Bureau cartographic boundary files
 U.S. Board on Geographic Names

External links
 Indiana Township Association
 United Township Association of Indiana

Townships in Elkhart County, Indiana
Townships in Indiana